Melacoryphus lateralis is a species of true bug, one of several called black-and-red seed bug. Black and fringed with red and gray, some call it the charcoal seed bug, due to its resemblance to a dying ember. Native to the deserts of western North America, they have a tendency to appear in large numbers in the late summer.

References

Lygaeidae
Insects described in 1852
Hemiptera of North America